Generalarzt (short: GenArzt or GA) is the designation of a military rank as well as the official title in German speaking armed forces. It is equivalent to the Admiralarzt / Generalapotheker and Brigadegeneral / Flottillenadmiral.

Bundeswehr
Generalarzt, Admiralarzt, Generalapotheker, and Admiralapotheker are the lowest general ranks of the Joint Medical Service or the military medical area of the Bundeswehr.

Promoted to that senior rank might be assignments or appointments as follows:
Chief surgeon of the Federal Armed Forces Hospital Berlin, – Hamburg, – Koblenz, and – Ulm
Inspector dental medicine of the Bundeswehr (de: Inspizient Zahnmedizin der Bundeswehr)
Inspector military pharmaceutics of the Bundeswehr – Generalapotheker (de: Inspizient Wehrpharmazie der Bundeswehr)
  Surgeon General of the Heer (de: Generalarzt des Heeres)
  Surgeon General of the Luftwaffe (de: Generalarzt der Luftwaffe)
Surgeon Admiral of the Marine (de: Admiralarzt des Heeres)

Equivalent to this one-star rank (NATO-Rangcode OF-6) are Brigadegeneral (en: Brigadier general) of the Heer or Luftwaffe, and the Flottillenadmiral (en: Flotilla admiral) of the Marine.

Address
The manner of formal addressing of military surgeons with the rank Generalarzt (OF6, one-star), Generalstabsarzt (OF7, two stars) or Generaloberstabsarzt is, „Herr/Frau Generalarzt“. At the other hand, military surgeons with the rank Admiralarzt (OF6, one-star), Admiralstabsarzt (OF7, two stars) or Admiraloberstabsarzt is, „Herr/Frau Admiralarzt“. Military persons with the rank Generalapotheker (OF6, one-star), will be addressed „Herr/Frau Generalapotheker“, and with the rank Admiralapotheker (OF6, one-star), will be addressed „Herr/Frau Admiralapotheker“,.

Rank insignias
On the shoulder straps (Heer, Luftwaffe) there is one golden star in golden oak leaves and the career insignia (de: Laufbahnabzeichen) as symbol of the medical standing, or course of studies. Regarding the Marine, the career insignia is in the middle of both sleeves, tree cm above the cuff strips, and on the shoulder straps between strips and button.

Sequence of ranks ascenting

Wehrmacht 1933 – 1945

Generalarzt of the Wehrmacht was comparable to the Generalmajor (OF-6, one star), as well as to the Brigadeführer and Generalmajor of the Waffen-SS.

In line to the so-called Reichsbesoldungsordnung (en: Reich's salary order), appendixes to the Salary law of the German Empire (de: Besoldungsgesetz des Deutschen Reiches) of 1927 (changes 1937 – 1940), the comparative ranks were as follows: C 3

Generalmajor (Heer and Luftwaffe)
Konteradmiral (Kriegsmarine)
Generalarzt from 1934 (medical service of the Wehrmacht)
Admiralarzt, introduced June 26, 1935 (medical service of the Kriegsmarine)
Generalveterinär from 1934 (veterinarian service of the Wehrmacht)

Comparative military ranks

Kriegsmarine 
Rank designations of the Kriegsmarine as to Match 30, 1934, are contained in the table below.

Germany before 1933

In Germany before 1933 Generalstabsarzt was normally the chief of the medical service of an Army corps (Corps surgeon, de: Korpsarzt), and in some cases of a Division (Division surgeon, de: Divisionsarzt).

In Prussian Army Generalarzt, in sense of general surgeon as a staff position, was a senior military official (de: oberer Militärbeamter) with a definite rank, in the first instance Major (OF3). Since 1856 he could rise to Oberstleutnant (OF4) or even to Oberst (OF5). Senior Generalstabsärzte were often promoted to Generalmajor.
 
Equivalent authority, mandate and competence were with the Admiralarzt of the Imperial German Navy. Regular assignments to that staff position were the Medical Offices on Baltic Sea and North Sea, e.g. Kiel and Wilhelmshaven. An Admiralarzt of the Navy's Medical corps could normally be promoted up to the OF5-rank Kapitän zur See.

Officers with that rank
 Walther Asal (1891–1987)
 Erwin Angermeyer (1888–1963)
 Karl Arndt (1909–1943)
 Rudolf Attig (1893–1981), Genralarzt (July 1, 1944)
 Hermann Bach (1870–1941)
 Ernst Baader (1894–1953)
 Paul Baethke (1895–1953)
 Hans-Joachim Barnewitz (1892–1965)
 Wilhelm Baumeister (1887–1963)
 Alfred Bayer (1888–1952)
 Paul Baethke (1895–1953)
 Hermann Bach (1870–1941)
 Ernst Becker (1884–1962)
 Rudolf von Burk (1841–1924)
 Walter Groth (1883–1947)
 Stanislaus von Mielecki (1851–1938)(O.Pusch), Königl. Preußicher Generalarzt, Balley Brandenburg Ehrenritter 1917 und Rechtritter 1926 des Johanniter Ordens
 Dirk Raphael (born 1953)
 Ferdinand Sauerbruch (1875–1951), Generalarzt des Heeres 1942
 Verena von Weymarn (born 1943), Generalarzt der Luftwaffe
 Eugen Wullen (1892–1967)
 Arno Roßlau (born 1948)

References

Further reading 
 Neumann, Alexander: Arzttum ist immer Kämpfertum - Die Heeressanitätsinspektion und das Amt "Chef des Wehrmachtsanitätswesens" im Zweiten Weltkrieg (1939–1945), 2005. 
 Süß, Winfried: Der "Völkskörper" im Krieg: Gesundheitspolitik, Gesundheitsverhältnisse und Krankenmord im nationalsozialistischen Deutschland 1939-1945, 2003. 

Military ranks of Germany
One-star officers of Nazi Germany
One-star officers of the Bundeswehr

da:Generallæge